Minuscule 241 (in the Gregory-Aland numbering), δ 507 (Soden), is a Greek minuscule manuscript of the New Testament, on parchment. Palaeographically it has been assigned to the 11th century. Formerly it was labelled by 241e, 104a, 120p, and 47r.

Description 

The codex contains entire the text of the New Testament, on 353 parchment leaves (size ). The text is written in one column per page, 31 lines per page. The order of books is Gospels, Acts, Pauline epistles, Catholic epistles, and Book of Revelation. It is beautifully written.

Text 

The Greek text of the codex is a representative of the Alexandrian text-type. The text contains rare readings. Kurt Aland did not place it in any Category.
It was not examined by the Claremont Profile Method.

In 1 John 5:6 it has textual variant δι υδατος και πνευματος together with the manuscripts 43, 463, 945, 1241, 1831, 1877, 1891.

History 

The manuscript was bought by Alexius for 52 aspri in 1453 in Constantinople. Pachonius, a monk sent it in 1616, along with other books to the monastery Dochiarii at Mount Athos. It was brought to Moscow, by the monk Arsenius, on the suggestion of the Patriarch Nikon, in the reign of Alexei Mikhailovich Romanov (1645-1676). The manuscript was collated by C. F. Matthaei. In 1788 it was bought for the library in Dresden. It was examined by Matthaei, Tregelles, Gebhardt, and Gregory. Herman C. Hoskier collated its text (only for Apocalypse).

The manuscript came to Dresden at the end of the 18th century and was housed at the Sächsische Landesbibliothek (A 172).

See also 

 List of New Testament minuscules
 Biblical manuscript
 Textual criticism

Notes

References

Further reading 

 C. F. Matthaei, Novum Testamentum Graece et Latine (Riga, 1782-1788). (as k)
 Herman C. Hoskier, Concernig the Text of the Apocalypse (London, 1929), vol. 1, pp. 133–137.

External links 
 

Greek New Testament minuscules
11th-century biblical manuscripts